The little soft-furred rat (Rattus mollicomulus) is a species of rodent in the family Muridae. It is found only on the upper slopes of Mount Lampobattang in Bantaeng Regency, South Sulawesi, Indonesia. It gets its name from its soft, silky fur. It is smaller than a roof rat, but larger than a house mouse.

References

Rattus
Rodents of Sulawesi
Mammals described in 1935
Taxonomy articles created by Polbot
Taxa named by George Henry Hamilton Tate